Compound (formerly known as Metamorphic Ventures) is a New York-based seed fund that invests in startup and early-stage technology companies. In March 2014, the company announced a new fund with close to $70 million. It also added Google vice president of sales John McAtter, Yahoo! director of product management Robby Stein, and HSN chief Mindy Grossman to its advisory board. In 2016, Metamorphic Ventures changed its name to Compound.

Investments

References

External links
Compound official website

Venture capital firms of the United States
Companies based in New York (state)